The  is a DC electric multiple unit (EMU) commuter train type operated by the private railway operator Tobu Railway in Japan since 1981.

Operations
First entering service in 1981 on the Tobu Tojo Line, this was the first stainless steel EMU type to be introduced by Tobu. A total of ten 10-car sets were ultimately built for use on through-running services over the Tokyo Metro Yurakucho Line and Tokyo Metro Fukutoshin Line, as well as Tojo Line services between Ikebukuro and Ogawamachi.

Variants
 Prototype set 9101
 Production sets 9102-9108
 9050 series VVVF sets 9151-9152

Prototype set 9101

Built in October 1981, this was the first stainless steel EMU type to be introduced by Tobu, and featured a bodyline stripe using the same "Royal maroon" colour as previously used on Tobu 1720 series "DRC" trains. Set 9101 was built jointly by three manufacturers, with four cars (9101–9401) built by Tokyu Car Corporation, two cars (9501–9601) by Fuji Heavy Industries, and four cars (9701–9001) by Alna Koki (now Alna Sharyo).

The seats on this set were originally brown, but this was later changed to the standard light green colour.

Formation

The M1 cars are each fitted with one scissors type pantograph.

Production sets 9102-9108
Sets 9102 to 9107 were built in 1987, incorporating a number of minor improvements over the prototype set. Seat width was increased from 425 mm to 450 mm.

An additional set, 9108, was built in 1991, based on the 10030 series lightweight body style.

Formation

The M1 cars are each fitted with one single-arm pantograph.

9050 series VVVF sets
Two 9050 series sets were introduced in December 1994, coinciding with the opening of the "Yurakucho New Line" (now part of the Tokyo Metro Fukutoshin Line) between Kotakemukaihara and Ikebukuro. These incorporated further design improvements and changes similar to the 20050 series trains, notably VVVF control, bolsterless bogies, 3-colour LED destination indicators, LED interior passenger information displays, and brown seat moquette. The LCD passenger information displays were removed in 1999.

Formation

The M5 and M7 cars are each fitted with one single-arm pantograph.

Refurbishment
From April 2007 to 2008, all of the 9000 and 9050 series sets except prototype set 9101 underwent refurbishment ahead of introduction on Tokyo Metro Fukutoshin Line inter-running services from June 2008. Refurbishment included totally new interiors and cabs based on the 50070 series design. Externally, single-arm pantographs were fitted, and the destination indicator blinds replaced with full-colour LED displays. Prototype set 9101 was not refurbished due to the different door spacing of this set, making it incompatible with the platform doors on the Fukutoshin Line. This set is restricted to Tōbu Tōjō Line overground duties.

Interior

References

External links

 Tobu 9000 series 
 Refurbished Tobu 9000 series (Japan Railfan Magazine) 

Electric multiple units of Japan
9000 series
Train-related introductions in 1981
Tokyu Car multiple units
Alna Koki rolling stock
Fuji rolling stock
1500 V DC multiple units of Japan